Bruno Siciliano (born 19 January 1938 in Rio de Janeiro) is a retired Brazilian professional footballer who played as a forward. He spent most of his career in Italy with L.R. Vicenza, Venezia, Juventus, and Bari before finishing his career playing for the New York Generals of the National Professional Soccer League.

References

1938 births
Living people
Brazilian footballers
Brazilian expatriate footballers
Expatriate footballers in Italy
Expatriate soccer players in the United States
Serie A players
Serie B players
L.R. Vicenza players
Venezia F.C. players
Juventus F.C. players
S.S.C. Bari players
National Professional Soccer League (1967) players
New York Generals (NPSL) players
Association football forwards
Footballers from Rio de Janeiro (city)